Sulcacis is a genus of tree-fungus beetles in the family Ciidae.

Species
These eight species belong to the genus Sulcacis:
 Sulcacis affinis (Gyllenhal, 1827) g
 Sulcacis bidentulus (Rosenhauer, 1847) g
 Sulcacis curtulus (Casey, 1898) i c g b
 Sulcacis fronticornis (Panzer, 1809) g
 Sulcacis japonicus Nobuchi, 1960
 Sulcacis lengi Dury, 1917 i c g b
 Sulcacis nitidus (Fabricius, 1792) g
 Sulcacis nobuchii Kawanabe, 1997
Data sources: i = ITIS, c = Catalogue of Life, g = GBIF, b = Bugguide.net

References

Ciidae genera